Kelachandra Joseph George (born 24 August 1949) is a politician from the state of Karnataka, India. He was a minister of large and medium size industry in the cabinet of H D Kumaraswamy and was the Minister for Bengaluru Development and Town Planning. He was previously the Home Minister of Karnataka. He was also the Minister of State (Independent Charge) Transport, Food and Civil Supplies in the Veerendra Patil government and Cabinet Minister for Housing & Urban Development in the S. Bangarappa government.

Early life
George was born on 24 August 1949 to Kelachandra Chacko Joseph and Mariamma Joseph in Chingavanam, in the Kingdom of Travancore (now in Kottayam, Kerala). His family moved to the Kodagu district of Karnataka in the 1960s. He spent most of his childhood there before relocating to Bangalore. Joseph and his sons founded the Kelachandra Group in 1980. George is married to Suja and has two children Rana and Renita.

Political career
KJ George joined the Indian National Congress in 1968. His political career started in 1969 when he was elected as the President of the Gonikoppal Town Youth Congress. During 1971–1972, he was the President of the Virajpet Taluk Youth Congress Committee.
From 1972 to 1973 he was the General of the Coorg District Youth Congress Committee and the President of this forum from 1973 to 1975.
In 1975 and through 1978 he became the Treasurer of the Karnataka Pradesh Youth Congress Committee.
In 1982, he was the General Secretary of the All India Youth Congress Committee where he served till 1985. He later served as the General Secretary- Karnataka Pradesh Congress Committee during and under the Presidentships of K. H Ranganath, N. Dharam Singh, S. M. Krishna, V. S. Kaujalgi, Allum Veerabhadrappa, Mallikarjun Kharge, Oscar Fernandes, Veerendra Patil and Janardhana Poojary.
In 1985, he was elected from the erstwhile Bharatinagar Assembly Constituency and became an MLA through 1994.
From 1985 to 1989, he was also the Secretary of the Congress Legislature Party. During the late 1980s and early 1990s, he was the Minister of State (Independent Charge) Transport, Food and Civil Supplies under Chief Minister Veerendra Patil and Cabinet Minister for Housing and Urban Development under Chief Minister Bangarappa.
Currently, he is a State Election Commission Member, the General Secretary K.P.C.C., a Member of the A.I.C.C. and Working Committee Member All India I.N.T.U.C.

K J George won from the Sarvagnanagar constituency at the assembly elections in 2013 by polling in 69,673 votes against his nearest rival Padmanabha Reddy of the Bharatiya Janata Party. During his tenure, the Bangalore Political Action Committee (B PAC) rated him the best among legislators of Bangalore, using data sets available in the public domain (Attendance in assembly, Starred questions, Unstarred questions, Percentage of MLALAD fund utilization, Perception survey, Educational qualification, Criminal record and Social Media etc.)

In 2018 Assembly Polls, George won from the Sarvagnanagar constituency by a margin of over 53,000 votes against Bhartiya Janta Party’s MN Reddy who stood a distant second.

References

External links

 K. J. George bio in Kannada

Indian National Congress politicians from Karnataka
State cabinet ministers of Karnataka
Living people
Politicians from Bangalore
People from Kodagu district
1949 births
Karnataka MLAs 2008–2013
Karnataka MLAs 2013–2018
Karnataka MLAs 2018–2023